The 44th Street Theatre was a Broadway theatre located at 216 West 44th Street in New York City from 1912 to 1945. It opened and operated for three years as the Weber and Fields' Music Hall. Its rooftop theatre, the Nora Bayes Theatre, presented many productions of the Federal Theatre Project in the mid 1930s. Its basement club became the famed Stage Door Canteen during World War II.

History

The 44th Street Theatre was located at 216 West 44th Street in New York City. The architect was William Albert Swasey, who designed the theatre in an 18th Century Georgian style. Built by The Shubert Organization in 1912, it was first named Weber and Fields' Music Hall. The theatre was renamed on December 29, 1913 when the comedy duo of Joe Weber and Lew Fields split with the Shuberts.

A theatre on the roof of the building, Lew Fields' 44th Street Roof Garden, became the Nora Bayes Theatre in 1918. In the mid-1930s it presented Federal Theatre Project shows.

In the basement of the 44th Street Theatre, the original rathskeller, became a small nightclub named the “Little Club” during Prohibition. 

In 1940 the building was purchased by The New York Times Company, which leased it back to Lee Shubert. When the American Theatre Wing requested the basement club as an entertainment venue for servicemen, Shubert gave them the property without charge. In March 1942 the 40-by-80-foot club space became the original Stage Door Canteen, which operated throughout World War II, became the subject of a popular film, and inspired other canteens throughout the United States.

In 1930, the Film Daily Yearbook listed 44th Street Theatre as a movie theatre. The theatre showed films for a brief period of time before returning to stage productions. For movie screenings, the theatre had 1,468 seats, and 1 screen.

The most notable film screening of 44th Street Theatre was of the German lesbian film “Maedchen in Uniform” in 1931. The movie played for a season twice daily and three times on Sundays and holidays. The theatre boasted that they had ‘Lower prices than any other two-a-day movie on Broadway’.

In 1940, The New York Times purchased the 44th Street Theatre. After Shubert's lease expired in June 1945, the building was demolished. A New York Times printing plant was built in its place, part of the newspaper's postwar expansion of its 229 West 43rd Street headquarters. The printing plant was later abandoned, but a plaque remains to mark the location of the Stage Door Canteen.

Notable productions

Productions staged at the 44th Street Theatre are listed at the Internet Broadway Database.
 1913: The Girl on the Film
 1914: The Lilac Domino
 1915: Katinka
 1916: The Blue Paradise
 1917: Maytime
 1924: Six Characters in Search of an Author
 1925: Song of the Flame
 1927: The Five O'Clock Girl
 1927: A Night in Spain
 1928: Animal Crackers
 1933: Face the Music
 1934: Four Saints in Three Acts
 1934: Conversation Piece
 1940: Liliom
 1941: The New Opera Company
 1942: Rosalinda (Die Fledermaus)
 1943: Winged Victory
 1944: Yellow Jack
 1945: On the Town

References

External links

Former Broadway theatres
Cinemas and movie theaters in Manhattan
Former theatres in Manhattan
Demolished theatres in New York City
Demolished buildings and structures in Manhattan
Buildings and structures demolished in 1945